This Is Me may refer to:

Albums 
 This Is Me (Charlie McDonnell album), 2010
 This Is Me (Heather Peace album), 2010
 This Is Me (Jully Black album), or the title song, 2005
 This Is Me (Kierra Sheard album), or the title song, 2006
 This Is Me (Randy Travis album), or the title song (see below), 1994
 This Is Me, by Charlee, 2011
 This Is Me, by Bakithi Kumalo, 2005
 This Is Me, by Eddie from Ohio, 2004

Films 
 This Is Me (film), a 2015 Chinese film

Songs 
 "This Is Me" (Demi Lovato song), from the 2008 film Camp Rock
 "This Is Me" (Dream song), 2001
"This Is Me" (The Greatest Showman song), 2017, performed by Keala Settle in the film and covered by Kesha
 "This Is Me" (Misia song), 2011
 "This Is Me" (Monrose song), 2010
 "This Is Me" (Randy Travis song), 1994
 "This Is Me", by Skye Sweetnam, from the movie The Barbie Diaries
 "This Is Me", by Juelz Santana, from the album  What the Game's Been Missing!
 "This Is Me/Goodbye", by Tech N9ne, from the album Everready (The Religion)
 "This Is Me", by Status Quo, from the album The Party Ain't Over Yet
 "This Is Me", by Reks, from the album Rhythmatic Eternal King Supreme

See also 
 This Is Me... Justified and Stripped, a 2004 album by Butch Walker
 This Is Me... Then, a 2002 album by Jennifer Lopez
 This Is M.E., a 2014 album by Melissa Etheridge